Oltinkoʻl District is a district of Andijan Region, Uzbekistan. The seat of the district is the village Oltinkoʻl. The district was established on June 26, 1939.

Administrative divisions
The district consists of 11 urban-type settlements and 8 rural communities:

Geography
Oltinkoʻl District lies in the central part of Andijan Region in eastern Uzbekistan. The relief is represented by lowlands and hills. The climate is subtropical high upland, with an average July temperature of 25-28 ˚ C, and an average February temperature of -5 - -7 ˚ C. Sometimes in summer the temperature reaches as high as 43 ˚ C, and as low as -18 ˚ C in the winter. The growing season is 160 - 180 days, with an average annual rainfall of up to 225 mm. Wild animals are rare, but there are rodents, reptiles and birds.

References

Districts of Uzbekistan
Andijan Region
States and territories established in 1939
1939 establishments in the Soviet Union